Berenice of Cilicia, also known as Julia Berenice and sometimes spelled Bernice (Bereníkē or Berníkē; 28 – after 81), was a Jewish client queen of the Roman Empire during the second half of the 1st century. Berenice was a member of the Herodian Dynasty that ruled the Roman province of Judaea between 39 BCE and 92 CE. She was the daughter of King Herod Agrippa I and  Cypros and a sister of King Herod Agrippa II.

What little is known about her life and background comes mostly from the early historian Flavius Josephus, who detailed a history of the Jewish people and wrote an account of the Jewish Rebellion of 67. Suetonius, Tacitus, Dio Cassius, Aurelius Victor, and Juvenal also tell about her. She is also mentioned in the Acts of the Apostles (25:13, 23; 26:30). However, it is for her tumultuous love life that she is primarily known from the Renaissance. Her reputation was based on the bias of the Romans against Eastern princesses like Cleopatra, or later Zenobia. After a number of failed marriages throughout the 40s, she spent much of the remainder of her life at the court of her brother Herod Agrippa II, amidst rumors the two were carrying on an incestuous relationship. During the First Jewish-Roman War, she began a love affair with the future emperor Titus Flavius Vespasianus. However, her unpopularity among the Romans compelled Titus to dismiss her on his accession as emperor in 79. When he died two years later, she disappeared from the historical record.

Early life 
Berenice was born in 28 to Herod Agrippa and Cypros, as granddaughter to Aristobulus IV and great-granddaughter to Herod the Great. Her elder brother was Agrippa II (b. 27), and her younger sisters were Mariamne (b. 34) and Drusilla (b. 38). According to Josephus, there was also a younger brother called Drusus, who died before his teens. Her family constituted part of what is known as the Herodian Dynasty, who ruled the Judaea Province between 39 BCE and 92 CE.

Josephus records three short-lived marriages in Berenice's life, the first which took place sometime between 41 and 43, when she was between the ages of 13 and 15, to Marcus Julius Alexander, brother of Tiberius Julius Alexander and son of Alexander the Alabarch of Alexandria. On his early death in 44, she was married to her father's brother, Herod of Chalcis, with whom she had two sons, Berenicianus and Hyrcanus. After her husband died in 48, she lived with her brother Agrippa for several years and then married Polemon II of Pontus, king of Cilicia, whom she subsequently deserted. According to Josephus, Berenice requested this marriage to dispel rumors that she and her brother were carrying on an incestuous relationship, with Polemon being persuaded to this union mostly on account of her wealth. However the marriage did not last and she soon returned to the court of her brother. Josephus was not the only ancient writer to suggest incestuous relations between Berenice and Agrippa. Juvenal, in his sixth satire, outright claims that they were lovers. Whether this was based on truth remains unknown. Berenice indeed spent much of her life at the court of Agrippa, and by all accounts shared almost equal power. Popular rumors may also have been fueled by the fact that Agrippa himself never married.

Like her brother, Berenice was a client ruler of the parts of the Roman Empire that lie in the present-day Israel. The Acts of the Apostles records that during this time, Paul the Apostle appeared before their court at Caesarea.

During Jewish-Roman wars

Early phase of the revolt 

In 64 emperor Nero appointed Gessius Florus as procurator of the Judaea Province. During his administration, the Jews were systematically discriminated against in favour of the Greek population of the region. Tensions quickly rose to civil unrest when Florus plundered the treasury of the Temple of Jerusalem under the guise of imperial taxes. Following riots, the instigators were arrested and crucified by the Romans. Appalled at the treatment of her countrymen, Berenice travelled to Jerusalem in 66 to personally petition Florus to spare the Jews.  Not only did he refuse to comply with her requests, Berenice herself was nearly killed during skirmishes in the city. Likewise a plea for assistance to the legate of Syria, Cestius Gallus, met with no response.

To prevent Jewish violence from further escalating, Agrippa assembled the populace and delivered a tearful speech to the crowd in the company of his sister, but the Jews alienated their sympathies when the insurgents burned down their palaces. They fled the city to Galilee where they later gave themselves up to the Romans. Meanwhile, Cestius Gallus moved into the region with the Twelfth legion, but was unable to restore order and suffered defeat at the battle of Beth-Horon, forcing the Romans to retreat from Jerusalem.

Affair with Titus
Emperor Nero then appointed Vespasian to put down the rebellion; he landed in Judaea with Fifth and Tenth legions in 67. He was later joined at Ptolemais by his son Titus, who brought with him the Fifteenth legion. With a strength of 60,000 professional soldiers, the Romans quickly swept across Galilee and by 69 marched on Jerusalem.

It was during this time that Berenice met and fell in love with Titus, who was eleven years her junior. The Herodians sided with the Flavians during the conflict, and later in 69, the Year of the Four Emperors—when the Roman Empire saw the quick succession of the emperors Galba, Otho and Vitellius—Berenice reportedly used all her wealth and influence to support Vespasian on his campaign to become emperor. When Vespasian was declared emperor on 21 December 69, Titus was left in Judaea to finish putting down the rebellion. The war ended in 70 with the destruction of the Second Temple and the sack of Jerusalem, with approximately 1 million dead, and 97,000 taken captive by the Romans. Triumphant, Titus returned to Rome to assist his father in the government, while Berenice stayed behind in Judaea.

In Rome
It took four years until Titus and Berenice reunited, when she and her brother Agrippa II came to Rome in 75. The reasons for this long absence are unclear, but have been linked to possible opposition to her presence by Gaius Licinius Mucianus, a political ally of emperor Vespasian who died sometime between 72 and 78. Agrippa II was given the rank of praetor, while Berenice resumed her relationship with Titus, living with him at the palace and reportedly acting in every respect as his wife. The ancient historian Cassius Dio writes that Berenice was at the height of her power during this time, and if it can be any indication as to how influential she was, Quintilian records an anecdote in his Institutio Oratoria where, to his astonishment, he found himself pleading a case on Berenice's behalf where she herself presided as the judge. The Roman populace however perceived the Eastern Queen as an intrusive outsider, and when the pair was publicly denounced by Cynics in the theatre, Titus caved to the pressure and sent her away.

Upon the accession of Titus as emperor in 79, she returned to Rome, but was quickly dismissed amidst a number of popular measures of Titus to restore his reputation with the populace. It is possible that he intended to send for her at a more convenient time. However, after reigning barely two years as emperor, he suddenly died on 13 September 81.

It is not known what happened to Berenice after her final dismissal from Rome. Her brother Agrippa II died around 92, and with him the Herodian Dynasty rule over Judaea came to an end.

Berenice in the arts 
From the 17th century to contemporary times, there has been a long tradition of works of art (novels, dramas, operas, etc.) devoted to or featuring Berenice and especially her affair with the Roman Emperor Titus. The list includes:

 Lettres de Bérénice à Titus (1642), a French novel by Madeleine de Scudéry
 Bérénice (1648–50), a French novel by Jean Regnauld de Segrais
 Tite (1660), a French drama by Jean Magnon
 Il Tito (1666), an Italian opera by Antonio Cesti (mus.) and Nicola Beregani (libr.)
 Bérénice (1670), a French drama by Jean Racine
 Tite et Bérénice (1670), a French drama by Pierre Corneille
 Titus and Berenice (1676), an English drama by Thomas Otway
 Tito e Berenice (1714), an Italian opera by Antonio Caldara (mus.) and Carlo Sigismondo Capace (libr.)
 Berenice (1725), an Italian opera by Giuseppe Maria Orlandini (mus.) and Benedetto Pasqualigo (libr.). Also set to music by Niccolò Vito Piccinni (1766)
  La clemenza di Tito (1734), an Italian opera by librettist Pietro Metastasio, set to music by over 40 composers, including
 Antonio Caldara (1734)
 Johann Adolph Hasse (1735)
 Giuseppe Arena (1738)
 Francesco Corradini (1747)
 Christoph Willibald Gluck (1752)
 Andrea Adolfati (1753)
 Niccolò Jommelli (1753)
 Ignaz Holzbauer (1757)
 Vincenzo Legrezio Ciampi (1757)
 Gioacchino Cocchi (1760)
 Marcello Bernardini (1768)
 Andrea Bernasconi (1768)
 Pasquale Anfossi (1769)
 Wolfgang Amadeus Mozart (La clemenza di Tito, 1791)
 Tito e Berenice (1776), an Italian opera by Raimondo Mei (mus.) and Carlo Giuseppe Lanfranchi-Rossi (libr.)
 Tito e Berenice (1782), a ballet by Paolino Franchi (chor.)
 Tito; o, La partenza di Berenice (1790), a ballet by Domenico Maria Gaspero Angiolini (mus. and chor.)
 Tito e Berenice (1793), an Italian opera by Sebastiano Nasolini (mus.) and Giuseppe Maria Foppa (libr.)
 Tito che abbandona Berenice (1828), a painting by Giuseppe Bezzuoli
 Titus et Bérénice (1860), a French opera by Leon-Gustave-Cyprien Gastinel (mus.) and Édouard Fournier (libr.)
 Daniel Deronda (1876), George Eliot's final novel, in which a set of drawings of Berenice's story is an important symbolic element
 Berenice (1890), a German novel by Heinrich Vollrat Schumacher
 Cross Triumphant, The (1898), a historical fiction novel by Florence Morse Kingsley
 Bérénice (1909), a French opera by Alberic Magnard (mus. and libr.)
 Titus und die Jüdin (1911), a German drama by Hans Kyser
 Lost Diaries: From the Diary of Emperor Titus (1913), an English novel by Maurice Baring
 Bérénice, l’Hérodienne (1919), a French drama by Albert du Bois
 Bérénice (1920), incidental music by Marcel Samuel-Rousseau
 Berenice (1922), an English drama by John Masefield
 Bérénice (1934), a French parody by Noel Ouden
 The Jospephus Trilogy (1932 - 1942), historical fiction by  Lion Feuchtwanger, in which Berenice plays a prominent role
 Berinikah (1945), a Hebrew drama by Eisig Silberschlag and Carl de Haas
 Le reine de Césarée (1954), a French drama by Robert Brasillach
 Berenice, Princess of Judea (1959), an English novel by Leon Kolb
 Mission to Claudies (1963), an English novel by Leon Kolb
 Agrippa’s Daughter (1964), an English novel by Howard Melvin Fast
 La pourpre de Judée: ou, Les délices du genre humain (1967), a French novel by Maurice Clavel
 Bérénice (1968), a French TV-film by Piere-Alain Jolivet
 Tito y Berenice (1970), a Spanish drama by Rene Marques
 Bérénice (1983), a French TV-film by Raoul Ruiz
 Assassins of Rome (2002) and the Enemies of Jupiter (2003) in Caroline Lawrence's historical youth fiction series The Roman Mysteries
 Lindsey Davis's historical fiction Falco series (circa 1990s - 2010s) incorporates Berenice as a minor recurring character 
 The Last Disciple (2004), a historical novel by Hank Hanegraff and Sigmund Brouwer, includes Berenice

In modern history, her aspirations as a potential empress of Rome have led to her being described as a 'miniature Cleopatra'.

Ancestry

See also
List of biblical figures identified in extra-biblical sources

Notes

References 
 Tal Ilan, Queen Berenice: A Jewish Female Icon of the First Century CE, Brill, 2022.

External links

Primary sources 
Josephus, Antiquities of the Jews, English translation
Josephus, The War of the Jews, Book II, English translation
Tacitus, Histories, Book 2, English translation
Cassius Dio, Roman History, Book 65, Chapter 15, English translation
"The 'New Cleopatra' and the Jewish Tax" Biblical Archaeology Society

Images 
Coinage of Berenice at Wildwinds.com

1st-century Romans
Flavian dynasty
1st-century Jews
Herodian dynasty
28 births
Year of death unknown
Judean people
Berenice
Women in the New Testament